Buglowiec  is a settlement in the administrative district of Gmina Lubomia, within Wodzisław County, Silesian Voivodeship, in southern Poland.

References

Buglowiec